Aleksei Ignatovich (Łacinka: Aliaksiej Ihnatovič; born ) is a Belarusian male artistic gymnast, representing his nation at international competitions. He participated at world championships, including the 2007 World Artistic Gymnastics Championships in Stuttgart, Germany.

References

1986 births
Living people
Belarusian male artistic gymnasts
Place of birth missing (living people)
Gymnasts at the 2008 Summer Olympics
Olympic gymnasts of Belarus